Lindsay Davenport and Martina Navratilova were the defending champions. The tournament is played using Fast4 format. 

The tournament was not completed as one of the match was not played because the teams chose not to play.

Draw

Group A
Standings are determined by: 1. number of wins; 2. number of matches; 3. in two-players-ties, head-to-head records; 4. in three-players-ties, percentage of sets won, or of games won; 5. steering-committee decision.

References

Draw 

Legends Women's Doubles